Virbia costata is a moth in the family Erebidae. It was described by Richard Harper Stretch in 1884. It is found in the western United States, ranging to western Oklahoma in the east and Colorado in the north.

Physical Characteristics 
The length of the forewings is about 11.7 mm for males and 13.5 mm for females. The male forewings are pale pinkish buff suffused with light salmon. The hindwings are flesh ocher with edges fringed with pale pinkish buff scales. The female forewings are solid clay to solid olive brown with salmon along the costal margin. The hindwings are salmon. Adults are on wing in July in Arizona, New Mexico, Colorado and Oklahoma. In the Big Bend region of Texas, adults are on wing in June and again in early August.

Larvae have been reared on plantain species.

References

Moths described in 1884
costata